Dennis Provisor (born November 9, 1943) is an American musician and songwriter. He recorded on several different labels, including 20th Century Fox and Valiant, under the name of Denny Provisor. He released some soulful singles as a solo artist. He later joined the groups The Hook, Blue Rose, and The Grass Roots. Provisor is a lead singer, keyboard player and songwriter.

Overview 

Provisor is a Los Angeles native who began playing piano at a very early age. He expanded to electric organ and other keyboard instruments as he joined several R&B or rock and roll cover bands while still in high school. He landed a recording contract with 20th Century Fox Records while he was a teenager and worked with producer Tommy Oliver. About two years later, Provisor signed with the Valiant label and released a couple more singles, including some songs he wrote himself. In 1968, he joined The Hook featuring ex-Leaves fuzz guitarist Bobby Arlin. He wrote a song called "Go" that appears on their Hooked album. He also sang lead on this song. He was in a band called Blue Rose when he auditioned for The Grass Roots. Terry Furlong (a future Grass Roots guitarist) was in the band. The Grass Roots actually came to check out Furlong for the open position but after seeing Provisor's musical abilities, they decided on him instead.

The Grass Roots 

Provisor's first album with The Grass Roots titled Leaving It All Behind immediately proved the wisdom of their choice. Besides writing several songs for the album, Provisor's powerful voice, both on lead and harmony vocals, added an energetic, soulful tone to The Grass Roots sound. The group scored their first hit single which was written by a member of the group, Provisor's melodic "Walking Through The Country", on which he also sang lead. The first concert in which Provisor played with The Grass Roots was a double bill with Creedence Clearwater Revival. Provisor played his first music festival with The Grass Roots at Newport Pop Festival in 1969 at the Devonshire Downs racetrack in California. They played on Sunday June 22 which was the final day of the festival as their top twenty hit "I’d Wait A Million Years" was hitting the airwaves. Jimi Hendrix, who played at this festival, asked Provisor to play with him but The Grass Roots manager wouldn't allow it. In Canada, The Grass Roots played at the Vancouver Pop Festival at the Paradise Valley Resort in British Columbia in August 1969.

Provisor and the group went on The Ed Sullivan Show. He and the group had many appearances on Dick Clark's American Bandstand. The Grass Roots were all set to have their own variety show. The show called "Get It Together" was produced by Dick Clark. The group wrote and performed the show's theme song. The group taped several skits with their first guest Eric Burdon, but the show was never picked up. The record company Dunhill, was constantly releasing hit singles. Many of them had a Provisor composition on the "B" side helping him to gain some writing royalties. The group set a record of 307 weeks on the billboard singles charts. The next Grass Roots album titled More Golden Grass included some Provisor originals including "I Can Turn Off The Rain". Also, "Come On And Say It" became the second hit for The Grass Roots that the group members had written themselves. It was composed by Grill, Entner, and Provisor. It was also the first single to showcase Provisor's soulful vocals set against the main melody at the end of the song. This would become a trademark of the group's sound on subsequent hit songs like "Sooner Or Later", "Two Divided by Love", and "Glory Bound" (which Provisor also co-wrote, with Barri, Price, and Walsh). On "Sooner or Later" and "Two Divided By Love", Provisor shares lead vocals with Grill.

Provisor officially left the group in 1972, shortly after drummer Coonce left the band. Provisor signed a recording contract with record producer Clive Davis as a solo artist. He began to record a solo album. Unfortunately, Davis was fired and Provisor's album was never completed. He was left without a contract or a label. Although Provisor's picture does not appear on The Grass Roots 1972 album Move Along, his stamp is most certainly all over the album. This album contains five songs that he wrote or co-wrote. He also sings lead on two of them ("Someone To Love" and "Only One"). Two other Provisor originals, "Monday Love" and the title cut "Move Along" are on the album and set the tone for the other songs included on it. In South America, Dunhill released the Move Along LP in Columbia with a white cover and photo of Coonce, Entner, Grill, and Provisor. This shows the dichotomy of this release, as it was produced as old group members were leaving and new ones were joining The Grass Roots during 1971–2.

After leaving The Grass Roots, Provisor continued to write songs. One of his songs was recorded by Rare Earth. Then in 1974, he re-joined The Grass Roots when they signed to Haven Records. Provisor's return re-energized the group. Once again trading off lead vocals with Grill, Provisor helped turn two of the Haven album's cuts, "Something About You" and "It's A Cryin' Shame", into instant classics. He wrote a final Grass Roots song appropriately titled "The Last Time Around". Provisor continued to tour with The Grass Roots for many more years, including a highly successful tour of Japan. He also worked on the 14 Greatest album released by Gusto Records with Grill. When Grill decided to produce a solo album titled Uprooted, Provisor was right there to help him and he wrote four songs for the album including the single "Rock Sugar".

Compositions and musical release performance 

Provisor composed twenty songs for The Hook, The Grass Roots, and Rob Grill. Four of these appeared as single "A" sides. They are "Walking Through The Country", "Come On And Say It", "Glory Bound", and "Rock Sugar". His other sixteen compositions appeared on single "B" sides and albums. He wrote frequently with Warren Entner and Rob Grill. Provisor played with The Grass Roots on seven albums, four of which charted. He took part in fourteen Grass Roots singles released, twelve of which charted.

The Hits 

Provisor married and moved to Wisconsin where he built his own home and lives with his wife and children today. His son, Ben Provisor, is a U.S. Open National Champion Greco-Roman 74 kg wrestler and a 2012 Olympian. His wife is a World Gold Wrestling Club Leader. Musical talent flows throughout the family with his daughter who sings and has performed with his group The Hits. He is still very actively performing with his group The Hits which has a year around performance schedule. He joined The Hits in 1984 marking over two decades with the group. He plays with experienced drummer/guitarist/front man Cookee Coquoz and veteran Wisconsin guitarist Artie Formiller. There were many other guitarists in the lineup including well known midwest children's and family entertainer Billy Grisack (AKA Mr. Billy). Until the band broke up after the loss of drummer/frontman Cookee Coquoz, Provisor and the group still perform some of his Grass Roots material. The Hits rarely tour outside of Wisconsin, but they have opened shows for many major acts appearing there. These include The Beach Boys, America, The Turtles, and The Grass Roots. When not playing music, Provisor enjoys being active on his computer. He plays video games which include his favorite, Slotomania. His old bandmate Grill passed on a love for fishing many years ago to him and he still enjoys the hobby. He would most like to be remembered for his singer/songwriter contributions to music.

DPX - the Dennis Provisor Experience 

After the Hits disbanded, Provisor teamed up with former Hits member Billy Grisack (guitar) and his son Wil Grisack (drums) to form DPX - The Dennis Provisor Experience. The band plays classic rock covers and many Grass Roots favorites at concerts, festivals, fairs, casinos and nightclubs in the Midwest. They plan to record new and other previously unreleased songs by Provisor in 2019.

Discography

Singles

Albums 

++ – Gold Record – RIAA Certification

References

External links 
 Dennis Provisor at Allmusic
 Dennis Provisor Website

American male singer-songwriters
Living people
Musicians from Los Angeles
1943 births
Singer-songwriters from California
21st-century American keyboardists
21st-century American male singers
21st-century American singers